Saçan is a Turkish surname. Notable people with the surname include:

 Adil Serdar Saçan, Turkish police chief
 Erdinç Saçan (born 1979), Dutch internet entrepreneur, columnist, and politician

Turkish-language surnames